Galeandra styllomisantha is a species of orchid. It is widespread across much of South America from Guyana to Argentina.

References

styllomisantha
Orchids of South America
Plants described in 1831